

Events

Pre-1600
 380 – Edict of Thessalonica: Emperor Theodosius I and his co-emperors Gratian and Valentinian II declare their wish that all Roman citizens convert to Nicene Christianity.
 425 – The University of Constantinople is founded by Emperor Theodosius II at the urging of his wife Aelia Eudocia.
 907 – Abaoji, chieftain of the Yila tribe, is named khagan of the Khitans.
1560 – The Treaty of Berwick is signed by England and the Lords of the Congregation of Scotland, establishing the terms under which English armed forces were to be permitted in Scotland in order to expel occupying French troops.
1594 – Henry IV is crowned King of France.

1601–1900
1617 – Sweden and the Tsardom of Russia sign the Treaty of Stolbovo, ending the Ingrian War and shutting Russia out of the Baltic Sea.
1626 – Yuan Chonghuan is appointed Governor of Liaodong, after leading the Chinese into a great victory against the Manchurians under Nurhaci.
1776 – American Revolutionary War: The Battle of Moore's Creek Bridge in North Carolina breaks up a Loyalist militia.
1782 – American Revolutionary War: The House of Commons of Great Britain votes against further war in America.
1801 – Pursuant to the District of Columbia Organic Act of 1801, Washington, D.C. is placed under the jurisdiction of the U.S. Congress.
1809 – Action of 27 February 1809: Captain Bernard Dubourdieu captures HMS Proserpine.
1812 – Argentine War of Independence: Manuel Belgrano raises the Flag of Argentina in the city of Rosario for the first time.
  1812   – Poet Lord Byron gives his first address as a member of the House of Lords, in defense of Luddite violence against Industrialism in his home county of Nottinghamshire.
1844 – The Dominican Republic gains independence from Haiti.
1860 – Abraham Lincoln makes a speech at Cooper Union in the city of New York that is largely responsible for his election to the Presidency.
1864 – American Civil War: The first Northern prisoners arrive at the Confederate prison at Andersonville, Georgia.
1870 – The current flag of Japan is first adopted as the national flag for Japanese merchant ships.
1881 – First Boer War: The Battle of Majuba Hill takes place.
1898 – King George I of Greece survives an assassination attempt.
1900 – Second Boer War: In South Africa, British military leaders receive an unconditional notice of surrender from Boer General Piet Cronjé at the Battle of Paardeberg.
  1900   – The British Labour Party is founded.
  1900   – Fußball-Club Bayern München is founded.

1901–present
1902 – Second Boer War: Australian soldiers Harry "Breaker" Morant and Peter Handcock are executed in Pretoria after being convicted of war crimes.
1916 – Ocean liner SS Maloja strikes a mine near Dover and sinks with the loss of 155 lives.
1921 – The International Working Union of Socialist Parties is founded in Vienna.
1922 – A challenge to the Nineteenth Amendment to the United States Constitution, allowing women the right to vote, is rebuffed by the Supreme Court of the United States in Leser v. Garnett.
1932 – The Mäntsälä rebellion begins when members of the far-right Lapua Movement start shooting at the social democrats' event in Mäntsälä, Finland.
1933 – Reichstag fire: Germany's parliament building in Berlin, the Reichstag, is set on fire; Marinus van der Lubbe, a young Dutch Communist claims responsibility.
1939 – United States labor law: The U.S. Supreme Court rules in NLRB v. Fansteel Metallurgical Corp. that the National Labor Relations Board has no authority to force an employer to rehire workers who engage in sit-down strikes.
1940 – Martin Kamen and Sam Ruben discover carbon-14.
1942 – World War II: During the Battle of the Java Sea, an Allied strike force is defeated by a Japanese task force in the Java Sea in the Dutch East Indies.
1943 – The Smith Mine #3 in Bearcreek, Montana, explodes, killing 74 men.
  1943   – The Holocaust: In Berlin, the Gestapo arrest 1,800 Jewish men with German wives, leading to the Rosenstrasse protest.
1951 – The Twenty-second Amendment to the United States Constitution, limiting Presidents to two terms, is ratified.
1961 – The first congress of the Spanish Trade Union Organisation is inaugurated.
1962 – Vietnam War: Two dissident Republic of Vietnam Air Force pilots bomb the Independence Palace in Saigon in a failed attempt to assassinate South Vietnam President Ngô Đình Diệm.
1963 – The Dominican Republic receives its first democratically elected president, Juan Bosch, since the end of the dictatorship led by Rafael Trujillo.
1964 – The Government of Italy asks for help to keep the Leaning Tower of Pisa from toppling over.
1971 – Doctors in the first Dutch abortion clinic (the Mildredhuis in Arnhem) start performing artificially-induced abortions.
1973 – The American Indian Movement occupies Wounded Knee in protest of the federal government.
1976 – The former Spanish territory of Western Sahara, under the auspices of the Polisario Front declares independence as the Sahrawi Arab Democratic Republic.
1988 – Sumgait pogrom: The Armenian community in Sumgait, Azerbaijan is targeted in a violent pogrom.
1991 – Gulf War: U.S. President George H. W. Bush announces that "Kuwait is liberated".
2001 – Loganair Flight 670A crashes while attempting to make a water landing in the Firth of Forth in Scotland.
2002 – Ryanair Flight 296 catches fire at London Stansted Airport causing minor injuries.
  2002   – Godhra train burning: A Muslim mob torches a train returning from Ayodhya, killing 59 Hindu pilgrims.
2004 – A bombing of a SuperFerry by Abu Sayyaf in the Philippines' worst terrorist attack kills more than 100 passengers.
  2004   – Shoko Asahara, the leader of the Japanese doomsday cult Aum Shinrikyo, is sentenced to death for masterminding the 1995 Tokyo subway sarin attack.
2007 – Chinese stock bubble of 2007: The Shanghai Stock Exchange falls 9%, the largest daily fall in ten years, following speculation about a crackdown on illegal share offerings and trading, and fears about accelerating inflation.
2008 – Jemaah Islamiyah terrorist Mas Selamat Kastari escapes from a detention center in Singapore, hiding in Johor, Malaysia until he was recaptured over a year later. 
2010 – An earthquake measuring 8.8 on the moment magnitude scale strikes central parts of Chile leaving over 500 victims, and thousands injured. The quake triggers a tsunami which strikes Hawaii shortly after.
2013 – A shooting takes place at a factory in Menznau, Switzerland, in which five people (including the perpetrator) are killed and five others injured.
2015 – Russian politician Boris Nemtsov is assassinated in Moscow while out walking with his girlfriend.
2019 – Pakistan Air Force JF-17 Thunder downs Indian pilot Abhinandan Varthaman's Mig-21 in an aerial dogfight and captures him after conducting airstrikes in Jammu and Kashmir.

Births

Pre-1600
 272 – Constantine the Great, Roman emperor (d. 337)
1343 – Alberto d'Este, Marquis of Ferrara (d. 1393)
1427 – Ruprecht, Archbishop of Cologne (d. 1480)
1500 – João de Castro, Portuguese nobleman and fourth viceroy of Portuguese India (d. 1548)
1535 – Min Phalaung, Burmese monarch (d. 1593)
1567 – William Alabaster, English poet (d. 1640)
1572 – Francis II, Duke of Lorraine (d. 1632)
1575 – John Adolf, Duke of Holstein-Gottorp (d. 1616)

1601–1900
1622 – Carel Fabritius, Dutch painter (d. 1654)
1630 – Roche Braziliano, Dutch pirate (d. 1671)
1659 – William Sherard, English botanist (d. 1728)
1667 – Ludwika Karolina Radziwiłł, Prussian-Lithuanian wife of Charles III Philip, Elector Palatine (d. 1695)
1689 – Pietro Gnocchi, Italian composer, director, historian, and geographer (d. 1775)
1703 – Lord Sidney Beauclerk, English politician (d. 1744)
1711 – Constantine Mavrocordatos, Ottoman ruler (d. 1769)
1724 – Frederick Michael, Count Palatine of Zweibrücken (d. 1767)
1732 – Jean de Dieu-Raymond de Cucé de Boisgelin, French cardinal (d. 1804)
1746 – Louis-Jérôme Gohier, French politician, French Minister of Justice (d. 1830)
1748 – Anders Sparrman, Swedish physician and activist (d. 1820)
1767 – Jacques-Charles Dupont de l'Eure, French lawyer and politician, 24th Prime Minister of France (d. 1855)
1779 – Thomas Hazlehurst, English businessman, founded Hazlehurst & Sons (d. 1842)
1789 – Manuel Rodríguez Erdoíza, Chilean lawyer and politician, Chilean Minister of National Defense (d. 1818)
1795 – José Antonio Navarro, American merchant and politician (d. 1871)
1799 – Edward Belcher, British naval officer, hydrographer, and explorer (d. 1877)
  1799   – Frederick Catherwood, British artist, architect and explorer (d. 1854)
1807 – Henry Wadsworth Longfellow, American poet and educator (d. 1882)
1809 – Jean-Charles Cornay, French missionary and saint (d. 1837)
1816 – William Nicholson, English-Australian politician, 3rd Premier of Victoria (d. 1865)
1847 – Ellen Terry, English actress (d. 1928)
1848 – Hubert Parry, English composer and historian (d. 1918)
1859 – Bertha Pappenheim, Austrian-German activist and author (d. 1936)
1863 – Joaquín Sorolla, Spanish painter (d. 1923)
  1863   – George Herbert Mead, American sociologist and philosopher (d. 1930)
1864 – Eemil Nestor Setälä, Finnish linguist and politician, Finnish Minister for Foreign Affairs (d. 1935)
1867 – Irving Fisher, American economist and statistician (d. 1947)
  1867   – Wilhelm Peterson-Berger, Swedish composer and critic (d. 1942)
1869 – Alice Hamilton, American physician and academic (d. 1970)
1872 – Alexandru Vaida-Voevod, Romanian politician, Prime Minister of Romania (d. 1950)
1875 – Vladimir Filatov, Russian-Ukrainian ophthalmologist and surgeon (d. 1956)
1877 – Adela Verne, English pianist and composer (d. 1952)
  1877   – Joseph Grinnell, American zoologist and biologist (d. 1939)
1878 – Alvan T. Fuller, American businessman and politician, 50th Governor of Massachusetts (d. 1958)
1880 – Xenophon Kasdaglis, Greek-Egyptian tennis player (d. 1943)
1881 – Sveinn Björnsson, Danish-Icelandic lawyer and politician, 1st President of Iceland (d. 1952)
  1881   – L. E. J. Brouwer, Dutch mathematician, philosopher, and academic (d. 1966)
1886 – Hugo Black, American captain, jurist, and politician (d. 1971)
1887 – Pyotr Nesterov, Russian captain, pilot, and engineer (d. 1914)
1888 – Roberto Assagioli, Italian psychiatrist and psychologist (d. 1974)
  1888   – Lotte Lehmann, German-American soprano and actress (d. 1976)
  1888   – Stephen McKenna, English novelist (d. 1967)
1890 – Mabel Keaton Staupers, American nurse and advocate (d. 1989)
1891 – David Sarnoff, American businessman, founded RCA (d. 1971)
1892 – William Demarest, American actor (d. 1983)
1895 – Miyagiyama Fukumatsu, Japanese sumo wrestler (d. 1943)
1897 – Marian Anderson, American singer (d. 1993)
1899 – Charles Herbert Best, American-Canadian physiologist and biochemist, co-discovered Insulin (d. 1978)

1901–present
1901 – Marino Marini, Italian sculptor and academic (d. 1980)
  1901   – Kotama Okada, Japanese religious leader (d. 1974)
1902 – Lúcio Costa, French-Brazilian architect and engineer, designed Gustavo Capanema Palace (d. 1998)
  1902   – Gene Sarazen, American golfer and sportscaster (d. 1999)
  1902   – John Steinbeck, American journalist and author, Nobel Prize laureate (d. 1968)
1903 – Reginald Gardiner, English-American actor and singer (d. 1980)
  1903   – Hans Rohrbach, German mathematician (d. 1993)
  1903   – Joseph B. Soloveitchik, Belorussian-American rabbi and philosopher (d. 1993)
1904 – James T. Farrell, American author and poet (d. 1979)
  1904   – André Leducq, French cyclist (d. 1980)
  1904   – Yulii Borisovich Khariton, Russian physicist and academic (d. 1996)
1905 – Franchot Tone, American actor, singer, and producer (d. 1968)
1907 – Mildred Bailey, American singer (d. 1951)
  1907   – Momčilo Đujić, Serbian-American priest and commander (d. 1999)
1910 – Joan Bennett, American actress (d. 1990)
  1910   – Peter De Vries, American journalist and author (d. 1993)
  1910   – Genrikh Kasparyan, Armenian chess player and composer (d. 1995)
  1910   – Kelly Johnson, American engineer, co-founded Skunk Works (d. 1990)
1911 – Oscar Heidenstam, English bodybuilder (d. 1991)
1912 – Kusumagraj, Indian author, poet, and playwright (d. 1999)
1913 – Paul Ricœur, French philosopher and academic (d. 2005)
  1913   – Kazimierz Sabbat, Polish soldier and politician, President of Poland (d. 1989)
  1913   – Irwin Shaw, American author and screenwriter (d. 1984)
1915 – Denis Whitaker, Canadian general, football player, and businessman (d. 2001)
1917 – John Connally, American lieutenant and politician, 61st United States Secretary of Treasury (d. 1993)
1920 – Reg Simpson, English cricketer (d. 2013)
1921 – Theodore Van Kirk, American soldier, pilot, and navigator (d. 2014)
1922 – Hans Rookmaaker, Dutch historian, author, and scholar (d. 1977)
1923 – Dexter Gordon, American saxophonist, composer, and actor (d. 1990)
1925 – Pia Sebastiani, Argentine pianist and composer (d. 2015)
  1925   – Kenneth Koch, American poet, playwright and professor (d. 2002)
1926 – David H. Hubel, Canadian-American neurophysiologist and academic, Nobel Prize laureate (d. 2013)
1927 – Aira Samulin, Finnish dancer and entrepreneur
  1927   – Peter Whittle, English-New Zealand mathematician and theorist (d. 2021) 
1928 – René Clemencic, Austrian composer, recorder player, harpsichordist, conductor and clavichord player
1929 – Jack Gibson, Australian rugby league player, coach, and sportscaster (d. 2008)
  1929   – Djalma Santos, Brazilian footballer (d. 2013)
  1929   – Patricia Ward Hales, British tennis player (d. 1985)
1930 – Jovan Krkobabić, Serbian politician, Deputy Prime Minister of Serbia (d. 2014)
  1930   – Peter Stone, American screenwriter and producer (d. 2003)
  1930   – Paul von Ragué Schleyer, American chemist and academic (d. 2014)
  1930   – Joanne Woodward, American actress 
1932 – Dame Elizabeth Taylor, English-American actress and humanitarian (d. 2011)
  1932   – David Young, Baron Young of Graffham, English businessman and politician, Secretary of State for Business, Innovation and Skills (d. 2022)
1933 – Raymond Berry, American football player and coach
  1933   – Malcolm Wallop, American politician (d. 2011)
1934 – Vincent Fourcade, French interior designer (d. 1992)
  1934   – Ralph Nader, American lawyer, politician, and activist
1935 – Mirella Freni, Italian soprano and actress  (d. 2020)
  1935   – Uri Shulevitz, American author and illustrator
1936 – Sonia Johnson, American feminist activist and author
  1936   – Ron Barassi, Australian footballer and coach
  1936   – Roger Mahony, American cardinal
1937 – Barbara Babcock, American actress
1938 – Jake Thackray, English singer-songwriter, guitarist, and journalist (d. 2002)
1939 – Don McKinnon, English-New Zealand farmer and politician, 12th Deputy Prime Minister of New Zealand
  1939   – Peter Revson, American race car driver (d. 1974)
1940 – Pierre Duchesne, Canadian lawyer and politician, 28th Lieutenant Governor of Quebec
  1940   – Howard Hesseman, American actor (d. 2022)
  1940   – Bill Hunter, Australian actor (d. 2011)
1941 – Paddy Ashdown, British soldier and politician (d. 2018)
1942 – Jimmy Burns, American singer-songwriter and guitarist 
  1942   – Robert H. Grubbs, American chemist and academic, Nobel Prize laureate (d. 2021)
  1942   – Charlayne Hunter-Gault, American journalist
  1942   – Klaus-Dieter Sieloff, German footballer (d. 2011)
1943 – Mary Frann, American actress (d. 1998)
  1943   – Morten Lauridsen, American composer and conductor
  1943   – Carlos Alberto Parreira, Brazilian footballer and manager
1944 – Ken Grimwood, American author (d. 2003)
  1944   – Graeme Pollock, South African cricketer and coach
  1944   – Sir Roger Scruton, English philosopher and writer (d. 2020)
1947 – Alan Guth, American physicist and cosmologist
  1947   – Gidon Kremer, Latvian violinist and conductor
  1947   – Sonia Manzano Vela, Ecuadorian writer
1950 – Annabel Goldie, Scottish lawyer and politician
  1950   – Julia Neuberger, Baroness Neuberger, English rabbi and politician
1951 – Carl A. Anderson, 13th Supreme Knight of the Knights of Columbus
  1951   – Lee Atwater, American journalist, activist and political strategist (d. 1991)
  1951   – Walter de Silva, Italian car designer
  1951   – Steve Harley, English singer-songwriter and guitarist
1953 – Gavin Esler, Scottish journalist and author
  1953   – Ian Khama, English-Botswanan lieutenant and politician, 4th President of Botswana
  1953   – Stelios Kouloglou, Greek journalist, author, director and politician
1954 – Neal Schon, American rock guitarist and singer-songwriter
1956 – Belus Prajoux, Chilean tennis player
  1956   – Meena Keshwar Kamal, Afghan activist, founded the Revolutionary Association of the Women of Afghanistan (d. 1987)
1957 – Danny Antonucci, Canadian animator, producer, and screenwriter
  1957   – Kevin Curran, American screenwriter and television producer (d. 2016)
  1957   – Robert de Castella, Australian runner
  1957   – Adrian Smith, English guitarist and songwriter 
  1957   – Timothy Spall, English actor 
1958 – Naas Botha, South African rugby player and sportscaster
  1958   – Maggie Hassan, American politician, 81st Governor of New Hampshire
1960 – Andrés Gómez, Ecuadorian tennis player
  1960   – Johnny Van Zant, American singer-songwriter
1961 – James Worthy, American basketball player and sportscaster
1962 – Adam Baldwin, American actor
1963 – Nasty Suicide, Finnish musician and pharmacist
1964 – Jeffrey Pasley, American educator and academic
1965 – Noah Emmerich, American actor
  1965   – Pedro Chaves, Portuguese racing driver
1966 – Donal Logue, Canadian actor and director
  1966   – Oliver Reck, German footballer and manager
  1966   – Baltasar Kormákur, Icelandic actor, director, and producer
1967 – Dănuț Lupu, Romanian footballer
  1967   – Jony Ive, English industrial designer, former chief design officer of Apple
1968 – Matt Stairs, Canadian baseball player and sportscaster
1969 – Gareth Llewellyn, Welsh rugby union player
  1969   – Juan E. Gilbert, American computer scientist, inventor, and academic
1970 – Kent Desormeaux, American jockey
  1970   – Patricia Petibon, French soprano and actress
1971 – Sara Blakely, American businesswoman, founded Spanx
  1971   – Derren Brown, English magician and painter
  1971   – David Rikl, Czech-English tennis player
  1971   – Roman Giertych, Polish lawyer and politician, Deputy Prime Minister of the Republic of Poland
  1971   – Rozonda Thomas, American singer-songwriter, dancer, and actress
1973 – Peter Andre, English-Australian singer-songwriter and actor
1975 – Aitor González, Spanish racing driver
  1975   – Prodromos Korkizoglou, Greek decathlete
1976 – Ludovic Capelle, Belgian cyclist
  1976   – Tony Gonzalez, American football player
  1976   – Sergei Semak, Ukrainian-Russian footballer and manager
1978 – James Beattie, English footballer and manager
  1978   – Kakha Kaladze, Georgian footballer and politician
  1978   – Emelie Öhrstig, Swedish skier and cyclist
  1978   – Simone Di Pasquale, Italian ballet dancer
1980 – Chelsea Clinton, American journalist and academic
  1980   – Scott Prince, Australian rugby league player
1981 – Josh Groban, American singer-songwriter, producer, and actor 
  1981   – Natalie Grandin, English-South African tennis player
  1981   – Élodie Ouédraogo, Belgian sprinter
1982 – Ali Bastian, English actress
  1982   – Pat Richards, Australian rugby league player
  1982   – Bruno Soares, Brazilian tennis player
1983 – Devin Harris, American basketball player
  1983   – Kate Mara, American actress 
1984 – Aníbal Sánchez, American baseball player
  1984   – Lotta Schelin, Swedish footballer
  1984   – Akseli Kokkonen, Norwegian ski jumper
1985 – Diniyar Bilyaletdinov, Russian footballer
  1985   – Vladislav Kulik, Ukrainian-Russian footballer
  1985   – Asami Abe, Japanese singer and actress
  1985   – Thiago Neves, Brazilian footballer
  1985   – Brett Stewart, Australian rugby league player
1986 – Yovani Gallardo, Mexican baseball player
  1986   – Jonathan Moreira, Brazilian footballer
  1986   – Sandeep Singh, Indian field hockey player
1987 – Florence Kiplagat, Kenyan runner
  1987   – Valeriy Andriytsev, Ukrainian wrestler
1988 – Iain Ramsay, Australian footballer
  1988   – Dustin Jeffrey, Canadian ice hockey player
1989 – David Button, English footballer
  1989   – Lloyd Rigby, English footballer
1990 – Chandler Jones, American football player
  1990   – Elijah Taylor, New Zealand rugby league player
1991 – Azeem Rafiq, Pakistani cricketer
1992 – Ioannis Potouridis, Greek footballer
  1992   – Jonjo Shelvey, English footballer
1995 – Laura Gulbe, Latvian tennis player
1996 – Chris Godwin, American football player
  1996   – Chittaphon Leechaiyapornkul, Thai singer and dancer
1998 – Todd Cantwell, English footballer

Deaths

Pre-1600
 640 – Pepin of Landen, Frankish lord (b. 580)
 906 – Conrad the Elder, Frankish nobleman
 956 – Theophylact, Ecumenical Patriarch of Constantinople (b. 917)
1167 – Robert of Melun, English theologian and bishop
1416 – Eleanor of Castile, queen consort of Navarre (b. c. 1363)
1425 – Prince Vasily I of Moscow (b. 1371)
1483 – William VIII of Montferrat (b. 1420)
1558 – Johann Faber of Heilbronn, controversial Catholic preacher (b. 1504)
  1558   – Kunigunde of Brandenburg-Kulmbach, German Noblewoman (b. 1524)

1601–1900
1659 – Henry Dunster, English-American clergyman and academic (b. 1609)
1699 – Charles Paulet, 1st Duke of Bolton, English politician, Lord Lieutenant of Hampshire (b. 1625)
1706 – John Evelyn, English gardener and author (b. 1620)
1712 – Sir William Villiers, 3rd Baronet, English politician (b. 1645)
1720 – Samuel Parris, English-American minister (b. 1653)
1735 – John Arbuthnot, Scottish physician and polymath (b. 1667)
1784 – Count of St. Germain, European adventurer (b. 1710)
1795 – Tanikaze Kajinosuke, Japanese sumo wrestler (b. 1750)
1844 – Nicholas Biddle, American banker and politician (b. 1786)
1887 – Alexander Borodin, Russian composer and chemist (b. 1833)
1892 – Louis Vuitton, French fashion designer and businessman, founded Louis Vuitton (b. 1821)

1901–present
1902 – Harry "Breaker" Morant, English-Australian lieutenant (b. 1864)
1921 – Schofield Haigh, English cricketer and umpire (b. 1871)
1931 – Chandra Shekhar Azad, Indian revolutionary (b. 1906)
1936 – Joshua W. Alexander, American judge and politician, 2nd United States Secretary of Commerce (b. 1852)
  1936   – Ivan Pavlov, Russian physiologist and physician, Nobel Prize laureate (b. 1849)
1937 – Hosteen Klah, Navajo artist, medicine man, and weaver (b. 1867) 
  1937   – Emily Malbone Morgan, American saint, foundress of the Society of the Companions of the Holy Cross (b. 1862)
1943 – Kostis Palamas, Greek poet and playwright (b. 1859)
1956 – Ganesh Vasudev Mavalankar, Indian lawyer and politician, 1st Speaker of the Lok Sabha (b. 1888)
1964 – Orry-Kelly, Australian-American costume designer (b. 1897)
1968 – Frankie Lymon, American singer-songwriter (b. 1942)
1969 – Marius Barbeau, Canadian ethnographer and academic (b. 1883)
1973 – Bill Everett, American author and illustrator (b. 1917)
1977 – John Dickson Carr, American author and playwright (b. 1905)
1980 – George Tobias, American actor (b. 1901)
1985 – Ray Ellington, English singer and drummer (b. 1916)
  1985   – Henry Cabot Lodge Jr., American politician and diplomat, 3rd United States Ambassador to the United Nations (b. 1902)
  1985   – J. Pat O'Malley, English-American actor and singer (b. 1904)
1986 – Jacques Plante, Canadian ice hockey player and coach (b. 1929)
1987 – Bill Holman, American cartoonist (b. 1903)
  1987   – Franciszek Blachnicki, Polish priest (b. 1921)
1989 – Konrad Lorenz, Austrian zoologist, ethologist, and ornithologist, Nobel laureate (b. 1903)
1992 – S. I. Hayakawa, Canadian-American linguist and politician (b. 1906)
1993 – Lillian Gish, American actress (b. 1893)
1998 – George H. Hitchings, American pharmacologist and academic, Nobel Prize laureate (b. 1905)
  1998   – J. T. Walsh, American actor (b. 1943)
1999 – Horace Tapscott, American pianist and composer (b. 1934)
2002 – Spike Milligan, Irish soldier, actor, comedian, and author (b. 1918)
2003 – John Lanchbery, English-Australian composer and conductor (b. 1923)
  2003   – Fred Rogers, American minister and television host (b. 1928)
2004 – Yoshihiko Amino, Japanese historian and academic (b. 1928)
  2004   – Paul Sweezy, American economist and journalist (b. 1910)
2006 – Otis Chandler, American publisher (b. 1927)
  2006   – Robert Lee Scott, Jr., American general and author (b. 1908)
  2006   – Linda Smith, English comedian and author (b. 1958)
2007 – Bernd Freytag von Loringhoven, German general (b. 1914)
2008 – William F. Buckley, Jr., American author and journalist, founded the National Review (b. 1925)
  2008   – Myron Cope, American journalist and sportscaster (b. 1929)
  2008   – Ivan Rebroff, German vocalist of Russian descent with four and a half octave range (b. 1931)
2010 – Nanaji Deshmukh, Indian educator and activist (b. 1916)
2011 – Frank Buckles, American soldier (b. 1901)
  2011   – Necmettin Erbakan, Turkish engineer and politician, 32nd Prime Minister of Turkey (b. 1926)
  2011   – Duke Snider, American baseball player, manager, and sportscaster (b. 1926)
  2011   – Gary Winick, American director and producer (b. 1961)
2012 – Ma Jiyuan, Chinese general (b. 1921)
  2012   – Tina Strobos, Dutch physician and psychiatrist (b. 1920)
  2012   – Helga Vlahović, Croatian journalist and producer (b. 1945)
2013 – Van Cliburn, American pianist (b. 1934)
  2013   – Ramon Dekkers, Dutch mixed martial artist and kick-boxer (b. 1969)
  2013   – Dale Robertson, American actor (b. 1923)
  2013   – Adolfo Zaldívar, Chilean lawyer and politician (b. 1943)
2014 – Aaron Allston, American game designer and author (b. 1960)
  2014   – Terry Rand, American basketball player (b. 1934)
2015 – Boris Nemtsov, Russian academic and politician, First Deputy Prime Minister of Russia (b. 1959)
  2015   – Leonard Nimoy, American actor (b. 1931)
  2015   – Julio César Strassera, Argentinian lawyer and jurist (b. 1933)
2016 – Yi Cheol-seung, South Korean lawyer and politician (b. 1922)
  2016   – James Z. Davis, American lawyer and judge (b. 1943)
2018 – Steve Folkes, Australian rugby league player and coach (b. 1959)
2019 – France-Albert René, Seychellois politician, 2nd President of Seychelles (b. 1935)
2021 – Ng Man-tat, Hong Kong actor (b. 1952)

Holidays and observances
Christian feast day:
Gabriel of Our Lady of Sorrows
George Herbert (Anglicanism)
Honorina
Leander
February 27 (Eastern Orthodox liturgics)
Doctors' Day (Vietnam)
Independence Day (Dominican Republic), celebrates the first independence of Dominican Republic from Haiti in 1844.
Majuba Day (some Afrikaners in South Africa)
Marathi Language Day (Maharashtra, India) 
World NGO Day

References

External links

 BBC: On This Day
 
 Historical Events on February 27

Days of the year
February